Nicholas Reece (born 1974 in London) is an Australian politician, policy activist and Deputy Lord Mayor of the City of Melbourne. He is a senior executive at the University of Melbourne and a principal fellow at the Melbourne School of Government. He is the chair of the board of directors at the Movember Foundation, and a commentator at Sky News Australia.

He previously held a number of roles in politics, including as secretary and campaign director of the Australian Labor Party (Victorian Branch) and as the director of strategy to former Prime Minister Julia Gillard. Reece's early career included time working as a lawyer at Maurice Blackburn and as a journalist at The Australian Financial Review.

Original 'Mo-Bro' and Director, Movember 
In 2004, Reece was one of the original 'mo-bros' who got together to raise funds for the Movember Foundation. Since then, Movember has raised almost $1 billion for prostate cancer, testicular cancer and men's mental health. Reece has served as a Non-Executive Director on the Movember Foundation Board of Directors since the establishment of the Board in 2007.

City of Melbourne 
Reece was elected as a councillor in the City of Melbourne in 2016. He currently chairs the planning portfolio and is Deputy Chair of Major Projects.

Politics and Government 
Until 2012, Reece held a number of roles as a ministerial staffer and Australian Labor Party executive, including:

 State Secretary and Campaign Director of the Victorian Branch of the Australian Labor Party
 Senior Adviser to Prime Minister Julia Gillard (Director of Strategy)
 Senior Adviser to Premier John Brumby (Deputy Chief of Staff, Head of Policy)
 Senior Adviser to Premier Steve Bracks (Press Secretary, Senior Economic Adviser) 
 Adviser, Policy Unit, Leader of the Opposition Kevin Rudd, 2007

Media 
Reece is a political commentator on Sky News and was the host of Politics HQ between 2017 and 2019. Reece also writes a regular column for Fairfax Media.

In 2015, Reece appeared in the award-winning documentary The Killing Season, which recounted the leadership struggles between Kevin Rudd and Julia Gillard between 2010 and 2013.

Personal life 
Reece is married to Felicity and has three children.

References

Victoria (Australia) local councillors
University of Melbourne people
Sky News Australia reporters and presenters
Fairfax Media
1974 births
Living people